Colostethus lynchi is a species of frog in the family Dendrobatidae. It is endemic to Colombia. Its natural habitats are subtropical or tropical moist lowland forests and rivers.

References

Colostethus
Amphibians of Colombia
Amphibians described in 1998
Taxonomy articles created by Polbot